Matías Soulé Malvano (born 15 April 2003) is an Argentine professional footballer who plays as midfielder or forward for  club Juventus.

Club career

Early career 
Soulé started his career aged six for Kimberley and six years later moved to Vélez with whom he refused the proposal to sign a professional contract. In January 2020, he moved to Juventus as free transfer. Soulé scored five goals and five assists in 30 appearances with under-19s in the 2020–21 season.

Juventus 
Soulé made his first appearance for Juventus on 24 July 2021 in a 3–1 preseason friendly win against Cesena, scoring his team's third goal in the 64th minute. On 22 August, Soulé made his official debut for Juventus U23—the reserve team of Juventus—in a first-round Coppa Italia Serie C 3–2 win against Pro Sesto. He made his Serie C debut on 28 August in a 2–1 win to Pergolettese. On 10 September, first-team manager Massimiliano Allegri included Soulé in the match-day squad for the Serie A game against Napoli.

On 15 September, Soulé scored his first two career goals in a 3–2 win against Feralpisalò in the second round of Coppa Italia Serie C. On 24 September, he extended his contract with Juventus until 2024 with option until 2026. On 7 November, he scored his first goal in Serie C in a 1–0 win against Lecco with a curling shoot in the 43rd minute. On 30 November, Soulé made his official debut for the first team in a 2–0 win against Salernitana coming on as substitute during the stoppage time.

Throughout the season, he also played for Juventus U19 in the UEFA Youth League. With two goals in six games, Soulé helped the U19s reach the semifinals, their best-ever placing in the competition. During the semifinal against Benfica, Soulé took the last penalty of the game which he missed causing his side's 4–3 lost at penalty shoot-outs after a 2–2 draw.

On 11 October, Soulé made his UEFA Champions League debut, playing for 15 minutes in a defeat against Maccabi Haifa.

International career 
Soulé made three appearances for Argentina U16.

On 3 November 2021, he was first called up for the Argentina national team ahead of the qualification rounds for the 2022 World Cup against Uruguay and Brazil; but didn't make either of the match day squads.

Style of play 
Soulé is a left-footed right winger, noted for his dribbling ability and set-piece taking, earning him comparisons to Angel Di Maria.

Personal life 
Soulé has an Italian passport. Soulé considers Independiente his favourite team and Lionel Messi his favourite player.

Career statistics

Club

References

External links 
Profile at the Juventus F.C. website
 
 

2003 births
Living people
Sportspeople from Mar del Plata
Argentine people of Italian descent
Argentine footballers
Association football midfielders
Association football forwards
Argentina youth international footballers
Club Atlético Vélez Sarsfield footballers
Juventus F.C. players
Juventus Next Gen players
Serie A players
Serie C players
Argentine expatriate footballers
Argentine expatriate sportspeople in Italy
Expatriate footballers in Italy